Cambridge Quantum (CQ) is an independent quantum computing company, based in Cambridge, England. Founded in 2014, CQ builds tools for the commercialization of quantum technologies with a focus on quantum software and quantum cybersecurity. CQ has developed an architecture agnostic quantum software development platform, TKET, around which the company has built enterprise applications for quantum cryptography, quantum chemistry, quantum machine learning and Quantum artificial intelligence.

History
CQ was established in 2014, and conceived through the University of Cambridge's “Accelerate Cambridge” program. Béla Bollobás, Imre Leader, Fernando Brandão and Simone Severini were its first scientific advisors.

In September 2020, CQ announced the launch of the first cloud-based Quantum Random Number Generation Service with integrated verification for the user. The application generates true maximal randomness on an IBM Quantum Computer.

In December 2020, CQ completed a $45 million financing from investors including Honeywell Ventures, IBM Ventures, JSR Corporation, Serendipity Capital, Alvarium Investments, and Talipot Holdings. This is the largest private investment ever announced for a quantum software company.

In January 2021, CQ appointed Prof Bob Coecke as its Chief Scientist, and opened an Oxford campus.

Sifted, backed by The Financial Times, placed CQ on its list of European Startups to Watch in 2021.

In June 2021, CQ announced its combination with Honeywell Quantum Solutions. The combined group announced their formal merger and launch as a new organization named "Quantinuum" in December 2021.

Technology
CQ has divisions dedicated to four core domains: quantum compiler (TKET), quantum cybersecurity (Quantum origin), quantum chemistry (EUMEN), quantum machine learning, .

Quantum software development platform – TKET

TKET is an architecture agnostic quantum software development platform that enables quantum software developers to optimize large circuits for general purpose quantum algorithms. TKET's routing and scheduling protocol translates machine independent algorithms into executable circuits by optimizing for physical qubit layout while reducing the number of required operations. TKET's Python module, pytket, allows any Python user with access to a quantum computer to deploy the tket SDK in any context, including commercially.

Quantum cybersecurity - Quantum Origin

CQ has launched the first cloud-based quantum random number generation (QRNG) service with integrated verification for the user. The application developed by CQ generates true maximal randomness (or entropy) implemented on an IBM quantum computer that can be verified and thus certified as truly quantum – and therefore truly and maximally random – for the first time. This cannot be done on a classical computer.

Quantum chemistry – EUMEN

CQ has developed EUMEN, an enterprise-grade quantum chemistry platform to perform computational chemistry calculations on current quantum hardware machines. EUMEN enables the design of pharmaceuticals, speciality chemicals, performance materials and agrochemicals.

Quantum machine learning

CQ has efforts in QML with a focus on quantum circuit learning on near-term noisy intermediate-scale quantum (NISQ) computers. The company has commercial work in deploying deep learning for time-series modeling and decision-making and specializes in quantum enhanced solutions for machine learning and optimization problems.

Quantum NLP

In 2020, CQ performed quantum natural language processing (NLP) on IBM hardware. This was the first time NLP has been performed on quantum hardware.

Ownership
Quantinuum is not listed on any stock exchange and is privately held. 54% of the company is owned by Honeywell, and Ilyas Khan, the founder of Cambridge Quantum and CEO of Quantinuum, is the next largest shareholder.

Locations
CQ is headquartered in Cambridge, but has offices in London (Victoria and St. James's), Oxford, Cambridge, Chessington, San Francisco, Washington, D.C. and Tokyo.

External links
 Official website

References 

Quantum programming
Quantum information science
Companies based in Cambridge
Technology companies established in 2014
Privately held companies of the United Kingdom
British companies established in 2014
Companies involved in quantum computing